Rameka Poihipi (born 14 October 1998, in New Zealand) is a New Zealand rugby union player, who plays for the  in Super Rugby and  in the Mitre 10 Cup. His preferred playing position is centre. Poihipi attended Hamilton Boys High School in Hamilton, where he was captain of the 1st XV. He has played for the Canterbury since 2019.

On 5 December 2020, Poihipi - who is of Ngāti Whakaue descent - made his debut for the Māori All Blacks in a one-off match against Moana Pasifika in Hamilton.

Reference list

External links
Chiefs player profile
itsrugby.co.uk profile
Poihipi Ultimate Rugby profile

1998 births
Living people
Ngāti Whakaue people
People educated at Hamilton Boys' High School
New Zealand rugby union players
New Zealand Māori rugby union players
Rugby union centres
Canterbury rugby union players
Chiefs (rugby union) players
Māori All Blacks players
Rugby union players from Hamilton, New Zealand